Acianthera albopurpurea is a species of orchid plant native to Brazil.

References 

albopurpurea
Flora of Brazil
Plants described in 2012